On November 2, 1982, the District of Columbia held an election for its non-voting House delegate representing the District of Columbia's at-large congressional district. The winner of the race was Walter E. Fauntroy (D), who won his sixth re-election. All elected members would serve in 98th United States Congress.

The delegate is elected for two-year terms.

Candidates 
Walter E. Fauntroy, a Democrat, sought re-election for his seventh term to the United States House of Representatives. Fauntroy was opposed in this election by Republican challenger John West who received 15.32%.  This resulted in Fauntroy being elected with 83.01% of the vote.

Results

See also
 United States House of Representatives elections in the District of Columbia

References 

United States House
District of Columbia
1982